A1 Team Lebanon was the Lebanese team of A1 Grand Prix, a former international racing series.

Management 

A1 Team Lebanon's owner is Tameem Auchi.

History 

Daniel Morad became the race driver for A1 Team Lebanon for the 2008-09 season. Although having previously driven in rookie sessions for A1 Team Canada, his Canadian-Lebanese heritage allowed him to switch nationalities, as he had not yet made his race debut. Morad scored Team Lebanon's first ever points in four years in the series at the first weekend of the season at Zandvoort, finishing in 8th place in the Feature Race.

Drivers 
In 2007 several Lebanese fans reacted disappointedly to the decision to drop Beschir, and set up an online petition calling on the team to reinstate him as lead driver.

Complete A1 Grand Prix results 
(key), "spr" indicates the Sprint Race, "fea" indicates the Feature Race.

References

External links
A1GP.com Official A1 Grand Prix Web Site
Official Team Website - A1 Team Lebanon

Lebanon A1 team
National sports teams of Lebanon
Motorsport in Lebanon
Auto racing teams established in 2005
Auto racing teams disestablished in 2009